

American Ultimate Disc League teams

East
 Boston Glory - Boston, MA
 New York Empire - New York City, NY
 Toronto Rush - Toronto, Ontario
 Montreal Royal - Montreal, Quebec
 Ottawa Outlaws - Ottawa, Ontario (folded after the 2022 season)

Central
 Chicago Union - Chicago, IL
 Detroit Mechanix - Detroit, MI
 Indianapolis AlleyCats - Indianapolis, IN
 Madison Radicals - Madison, WI
 Minnesota Wind Chill - Minneapolis, MN

West
 Austin Sol - Austin, TX
 Dallas Roughnecks - Dallas, TX
 Los Angeles Aviators - Los Angeles
 San Diego Growlers - San Diego, CA
 San Jose Spiders - San Jose, CA
Seattle Cascades - Seattle, WA

Atlantic
 Atlanta Hustle - Atlanta, GA
 DC Breeze - Washington DC
 Philadelphia Phoenix - Philadelphia, PA
 Pittsburgh Thunderbirds - Pittsburgh, PA
 Tampa Bay Cannons - Tampa Bay, FL
 Carolina Flyers - Raleigh, NC

Premier Ultimate League teams

Central 

 Atlanta Soul - Atlanta, GA
 Austin Torch - Austin, TX
 Indianapolis Red - Indianapolis, IN
 Medellin Revolution - Medellin, Colombia
 Milwaukee Monarchs - Milwaukee, WI
 Minnesota Strike - Minneapolis, MN

East 

 Columbus Pride - Columbus, OH
 DC Shadow - Washington, DC
 Nashville Nightshade - Nashville, TN
 New York Gridlock - New York, NY
 Portland Rising - Portland, ME
 Raleigh Radiance - Raleigh, NC

Western Ultimate League teams 

 Arizona Sidewinders - Arizona
 Los Angeles Astra - Los Angeles, CA
 Oregon Onyx - Portland, OR
 San Diego Super Bloom - San Diego, CA
 San Francisco Falcons - San Francisco, CA
 Seattle Tempest - Seattle, WA
 Utah Wild - Utah

North American men's teams

Northeast
 Bruises - Andover, Massachusetts 
 Chuck Wagon - Burlington, Vermont
 Colt - Newington, Connecticut
 GOAT - Toronto, Ontario
 New Jersey Cyclones - New Jersey
 Clockers - Ashland, Massachusetts
 Deathsquad - Needham, Massachusetts
 Ironside - Boston, Massachusetts
 Jerk Factory - New Brunswick & Nova Scotia
 Mad House - Halifax, Nova Scotia
 Man Up - Massapequa, New York
 Maverick - Ontario
 Mephisto - Montreal, Quebec
 Overcast - Syracuse, New York
 Phoenix - Ottawa, Ontario
 PoNY - New York, New York
 Projet P - Québec, Québec
 Red Circus - Halifax, Nova Scotia
 Ring Spinners - New York
 Red Tide - Portland, Maine
 Run Silent Run Deep - Boston, Massachusetts
 Smell My Mule - Ottawa, Ontario
 Juggalos Against Illuminati Leadership - Somerville, Massachusetts
 Big Wrench - Medford, Massachusetts
 Ubuntu - Boston, Massachusetts
 Fully Torqued - Upstate New York

Mid-Atlantic
 JAWN -- Philadelphia, Pennsylvania
 Southpaw - Philadelphia, Pennsylvania and New Jersey.
 Patrol - Philadelphia, Pennsylvania
 Citywide Special - Philadelphia, Pennsylvania
 Ring of Fire - Raleigh, North Carolina
 Truck Stop - Washington, D.C.
 John Doe - Washington, D.C.
 Temper - Pittsburgh, Pennsylvania
 Capitol Punishment - Washington, D.C.
 Brickhouse - Raleigh, North Carolina
 Olympus Moans - Edinboro, Pennsylvania
 Bear Proof -- Harrisburg, Pennsylvania
 F&Moose - Millersville, Pennsylvania
 Ultimatum -- Richmond, Virginia
 Medicine Men -- Baltimore, Maryland
 Garden State Ultimate -- Princeton, New Jersey
 Colorblind -- New Brunswick, New Jersey
 Warriors -- North Carolina
 Burgh -- Pittsburgh, Pennsylvania
 Pittsburgh Iron Man Ultimate -- Pittsburgh, Pennsylvania
 Roots of Rythmn -- Yardley, Pennsylvania
 Cannibal -- Raleigh, North Carolina
 Squires -- Richmond, Virginia
 Wendigo -- Washington, D.C.
 Town Hall Stars -- Washington, D.C.
 Oakland Ultimate - Pittsburgh, Pennsylvania
 Rebels - Haddonfield, New Jersey

Southeast
 BaNC - Charlotte, North Carolina
 Lost Boys - Columbia, South Carolina
 Southern Hospitality Tuscaloosa, Alabama
 Bullet- Macon, Georgia
 Hammer Bros. - Slidell, Louisiana 
 Abita (Affiliates) - Baton Rouge, Louisiana
 Shotgun - New Orleans, Louisiana
 Vicious Cycle - Gainesville, Florida
 UpRoar - Tampa Bay, Florida
 Tampa Tyranny - Tampa, Florida
 Florida United - Orlampahasseeville, Florida 
 Chain Lightning - Atlanta, Georgia
 El Diablo - Charleston, South Carolina/Savannah, Georgia
 Omen - Orlando, Florida
 Shrimp Boat Tallahassee, Florida
 Deep Fried - Jackson, Mississippi
 Freaks Uv Nature - Huntsville, Alabama
 Cartel - Miami, Florida 
 SMOKESHACK - Georgia/South Carolina
 Dune Cats - Athens, Georgia
 Voodoo - Knoxville, Tennessee

North Central
 Auxiliary - Quad Cities
 Big River - St. Louis, Missouri
 Bonehorn - Nebraska
 Butter - Twin Cities, Minnesota
 Climax - Minneapolis, Minnesota
 Dingwop - Duluth, Minnesota
 DIRT - Minneapolis, Minnesota
 General Strike - Winnipeg, Manitoba
 Gnarwhal - Des Moines, Iowa
 Hippie Mafia - Milwaukee, Wisconsin
 H1N1 - Milwaukee, Wisconsin
 Madison Club - Madison, Wisconsin
 Mad Men - Madison, Wisconsin
 Rebel Madness - Bloomington, Minnesota
 Prairie Fire - Kansas City, Kansas
 Shinigami - Minneapolis, Minnesota
 Illusion - Iowa City, Iowa
 Sub-Zero - Minneapolis, Minnesota
 UFO - Oshkosh, Wisconsin
 Twin Cities Imperial - Twin Cities, Minnesota
 NorthStar HOUSE United - Southeastern Wisconsin

Great Lakes
 Beachfront Property - Chicago, Illinois
 Black Market Ultimate - Chicago, Illinois
 Black Lung - Lexington, Kentucky
 Enigma - Dayton, Ohio
 FC Champaign - Champaign, Illinois
 Haymaker - Chicago, Illinois
 Lake Effect - Cleveland, Ohio
 Joyce - Columbus, Ohio
 Jurassic Shark - Toledo, Ohio
 Kentucky Flying Circus - Lexington, Kentucky
 Machine - Chicago, Illinois
 Madcow - Columbus, Ohio
 Natives - Chicago, Illinois
 Ruckus - Indianapolis, Indiana
 Salvage - Chicago, Illinois
 Skeetpocalypse - Bloomington, Indiana
 Spin-Itch - Rockford, Illinois
 Black Penguins - Bourbonnais, Illinois

South Central
 Johnny Bravo - Denver, Colorado
 Inception - Denver, Colorado
 ISO Atmo - Boulder, Colorado
  Choice City Hops - Fort Collins, Colorado
 Doublewide - Austin, Texas
 H.I.P. - Austin/Houston, Texas
 Riverside - Austin, Texas
 Crude - Dallas, Texas
 Plex - Dallas, Texas
 Space City - Houston, Texas
 Rage - San Antonio, Texas
 Abduction - Conway, Arkansas
 Utah Sooners - Utah
 Texas Thunder - San Antonio, Texas
 Flying Squirrels - Conway, Arkansas
 Dreadnought - Fayetteville, Arkansas
 Rawhide - Tulsa, Oklahoma
 Supercell - Norman, Oklahoma

Northwest
 Blackfish - Vancouver, British Columbia
 Furious George - Vancouver, British Columbia
 Warchild - Boise, Idaho
 Hippos - Oregon
 The Ghosts - Calgary, Alberta
 Rhino - Portland, Oregon
 Sockeye - Seattle, Washington
 Emerald City Ultimate - Seattle, Washington
 Voodoo - Seattle, Washington
 Ghost Train - Seattle, Washington
 SeaKing - Seattle, Washington
 Evergreen - Seattle, Washington
 Phantoms- Calgary, Alberta
 The Killjoys - Orem, Utah
 PowderHogs - Salt Lake City, Utah
 Refinery - Vancouver, British Columbia

Southwest
 Air Show - San Diego, California
 Anchor - Oakland, California
 Battery - San Francisco, California
 Brawl - Phoenix, Arizona
 Condors - Santa Barbara, California
 DOGGPOUND - Los Angeles, California
 Green River Swordfish - Davis, California
 Journeymen - Sunnyvale, California
 OAT - Livermore, California
 Renegade - Los Angeles, California
 Revolver - San Francisco, California
 San Diego Streetgang - San Diego, California
 Sprawl - Phoenix, Arizona
 Sundowners - Santa Barbara, California

North American women's teams

Northeast
 Baywatch - Connecticut
 Brooklyn Book Club - New York
 Brute Squad - Cambridge, Massachusetts
 Capitals - Toronto, Ontario & Ottawa, Ontario
 Dino - New York City, New York
 Frolic - Portland, Maine
 HOPE - Providence, Rhode Island
 Vice - Boston, Massachusetts
 QUB - Quebec City, Quebec
 Roc Paper Scissors - Rochester, New York
 Salty - Halifax, Nova Scotia
 Siege - Boston, Massachusetts
 Stella - Ottawa, Ontario
 Storm - Montreal, Quebec
 Sugar Shack - Burlington, Vermont
 Bent - New York
 PPF - Waterloo, Ontario
 Starling – Northhampton, Massachusetts

Mid-Atlantic
 Agency - Washington, D.C.
 Broad City - Philadelphia, PA
 Grit - Washington, D.C.
 Incline- Pittsburgh, PA
 Parcha- Pittsburgh, PA
 Pickup Lines - Washington, D.C.
 Pine Baroness - Princeton, New Jersey
 Scandal - Washington, D.C.
 Suffrage - Washington, D.C.
 Virginia Rebellion - Richmond, VA

Southeast
 Fiasco - Miami, Florida
 Laika - Huntsville, Alabama
 Outbreak - Atlanta, Georgia
 Ozone - Atlanta, Georgia
 Phoenix - Raleigh, North Carolina
 Steel - Birmingham, Alabama
 Tabby Rosa - Florida
 Shiver (formerly Taco Truck) - Raleigh, North Carolina
 Queen Cake - New Orleans, Louisiana

South Central
 Showdown - Texas
 Inferno - Houston, Texas
 Maeve - Dallas/Fort Worth, Texas
 Temptress - Dallas/Fort Worth, Texas
 Flying Squirrels - Conway, Arkansas
 Savage Skies - Siloam Springs, Arkansas
 Box - Denver, Colorado
 Molly Brown - Denver, Colorado
 Jackwagon - Denver, Colorado

North Central
 Pop - Minneapolis, Minnesota
 Crackle - Minneapolis, Minnesota
 Cold Cuts - Minneapolis, Minnesota
 Fusion - Winnipeg, Manitoba
 Heist - Madison, Wisconsin
 MystiKuE - Milwaukee, Wisconsin
 Wicked - Kansas City, Kansas

Great Lakes
 Autonomous - Ann Arbor, Michigan
 Dish - Chicago, Illinois
 Helix - Chicago, Illinois
 Nemesis - Chicago, Illinois
 Notorious C.L.E. - Cleveland, OH
 Rival - Columbus, Ohio/Ann Arbor, Michigan
 Rogue - Indianapolis, Indiana
 Sureshot - Cincinnati, Ohio

Northwest
 Riot - Seattle, Washington
 Underground - Seattle, Washington
 Seattle Soul - Seattle, Washington 
 Prime - Vancouver, British Columbia
 Traffic - Vancouver, British Columbia
 Zephyr - Vancouver, British Columbia
 Koi - Vancouver, British Columbia (formerly Wendigo)
 Schwa - Portland, Oregon
 Viva - Seattle, Washington

Southwest
 2nd Wave -Bay Area, California
 Deadly Viper Assassination Squad - Oakland, California
 FAB- Oakland, California
 Fury - San Francisco, California
 LOL - Oakland California
 Nightlock - San Francisco, California
 Rampage -Los Angeles, California
 Reign - Los Angeles, California
 Tempo - Palo Alto, California
 Ultraviolet - Bay Area, California
 Venom- Tucson, Arizona
 Viva - Los Angeles, California
 Wildfire - San Diego, California

Mixed teams

Northeast
Funk - Hudson Valley, New York
 7th Wheel - Boston, Massachusetts
 Ballometrics - Boston, Massachusetts
 Bashing Pinatas - Albany, New York
 BLU - Westport, Connecticut
 Darkwing - Mansfield, Massachusetts
 Destructors - Albany, New York
 District 5 - New Haven, Connecticut
 Weymouth XC - Boston, Massachusetts
 Flowchart - Somerville, Massachusetts
 The Ghosts - Boston, Massachusetts
 Gratuitous - Dover, New Hampshire
 Haos - Boston, Massachusetts
 Hellgate Ultimate - Queens, New York
 Jiggle the Handle - Northampton, Massachusetts
 Kung Fu Grip - Rochester, New York
 Lake Effect - Buffalo, New York
 Last Call - New York, New York
 Levitation Holmes - New York, New York
 Lions Ultimate - Boston, Massachusetts
 Mako - New Haven, Connecticut
 Manhattan Project - New York, New York
 Mars Meets Venus - Toronto, Ontario
 Mixed Nuts - Boston, Massachusetts
 Mogwai - Portland, Maine
 MUTT - Moncton, New Brunswick
 MuD - Guelph, Ontario
 Surge - Kingston, Ontario
 Muff 'N Men - Pittsburgh, Pennsylvania
 No Grass For You - New York, New York
 ONYX - Quebec, Quebec
 Odyssee - Montreal, Quebec
 Pleasure Town - Boston, Massachusetts
 Puppet Regime - New York, New York
 Revolution - New York, New York
 RUT - Burlington, VT
 Slow White - Boston, Massachusetts
 Spawn - Fredericton, New Brunswick
 S.S. ARG - Portland, Maine
 Townies - Ithaca, New York
 Union - Toronto, Ontario
 Unlimited Swipes - New York, New York
 Wild Card - Lexington, Massachusetts
 Whalers - Norwalk, Connecticut
 Zazzle - Moncton, New Brunswick
 Zazzleicious - Moncton, New Brunswick
 Zen - Toronto, Ontario

Mid-Atlantic
 AMP - Philadelphia, Pennsylvania
 American Hyperbole - Baltimore, Maryland
 Ant Madness - Arlington, Virginia
 Backfire - Raleigh, North Carolina
 Bitmap- Philadelphia, Pennsylvania
 Blueprint - New Jersey
 Boone Shakalaka - Boone, North Carolina
 Death by Jubilee - Washington, D.C.
 Dirty People - Newark, Delaware
 GSP - North New Jersey
 Hooray for Coed! - State College, Pennsylvania
 Hustlers - Baltimore, Maryland
 Jughandle - Princeton, New Jersey
 Key Party - Lancaster, Pennsylvania
 Legion - Lynchburg, Virginia
 Loco - West Chester, Pennsylvania
 Mother Huckers - Fredericksburg, Virginia
 Alloy - Pittsburgh, Pennsylvania
 Rail Yard - Roanoke, Virginia
 Renegade - Washington, D.C.
 Seven Minutes in Heaven - Richmond, Virginia
 Sidecar - Baltimore, Maryland
 Sparkle Ponies - Washington, D.C.
 Virginia Slims - Charlottesville, Virginia

Southeast
 Bucket - Atlanta, Georgia
 Burn Cycle - Tallahassee, Florida
 Carolina Reign - Piedmont Triad, NC
 Cahoots - Asheville, North Carolina
 Chewbacca Defense - Austin, Texas
 Cosa Nostra - Austin, Texas
 Death Throw - Denton, Texas
 Deliverance - Knoxville, Tennessee
 En Fuego - San Antonio, Texas
 Flash Flood - Houston, Texas
 Guillermo y Compania - Nashville, Tennessee
 Hinoki - Durham, North Carolina
 Hucking Dead - Jacksonville, Florida
 KoD - Pembroke Pines, Florida
 Naughty Pine - Carrboro, North Carolina
 Public Enemy - Fort Worth, Texas
 Risky Business - Dallas, Texas
 Rival - Atlanta, Georgia
 Swing State - Orlando, Florida
 TAU - Winston-Salem, North Carolina
 wHagonweel - Raleigh, North Carolina

Great Lakes
 Goose Lee - Cincinnati, Ohio
 Steamboat - Cincinnati, Ohio
 Santa Maria - Columbus, Ohio
 Prion - Champaign-Urbana, Illinois
 Handlebar - Ann Arbor, Michigan
 Omerta - Chicago, Illinois
 Interrobang - Indianapolis, Indiana
 The Abusement Park - South Bend, Indiana
 Jabba - Chicago, Illinois
 ELevate - Chicago, Illinois
 Stack Cats - Chicago, Illinois
 Liquid Hustle - Indianapolis, Indiana
 Pizza Party! - Chicago, Illinois
 Carlos Danger - Indianapolis, Indiana
 Snow Day - Grand Rapids, Michigan
 Fighting Kirbys - Dayton, Ohio
 Moonshine - Lexington, Kentucky
 Fifth Element - Louisville, KY
 North Coast Disc Co. - Cleveland, Ohio
 Bro Kittens - Athens, Ohio
 Mishigami - East Lansing, Michigan

North Central
 Drag'n Thrust - Minneapolis/St. Paul, Minnesota
 Chad Larson Experience - Ames, Iowa
 Thoroughbred - St. Louis, Missouri
 SWARM - Winnipeg, Manitoba
 MOFO - Winnipeg, Manitoba
 Minnesota Star Power - Minneapolis, Minnesota
 Mojo Jojo - Minneapolis, Minnesota
 Bird - Minneapolis, Minnesota
 No Touching! - Minneapolis, Minnesota
 Pushovers B - Minneapolis, Minnesota
 Troy's Bucket - Springfield, Missouri
 Cream City Crooks - Milwaukee, Wisconsin
 Boomtown Pandas - Madison, Wisconsin
 NOISE - Madison, Wisconsin
 Mad Udderburn - Madison, Wisconsin

Northwest
 Birdfruit - Seattle, Washington
 Lochsa - Boise, Idaho
 Bulleit Train - Seattle, Washington
 Mental Toss Flycoons - Missoula, Montana
 D'oh! - Seattle, Washington
 Shazam - Seattle, Washington
 Moonshine - Seattle, Washington
 Rainmakers - Tacoma, Washington
 Guard, Seize Them! - Seattle, Washington
 O'School - Olympia, Washington
 Eats, Throws, Leaves - Seattle, Washington
 Seattle MIXtape - Seattle, Washington 
 BFG - Seattle, Washington
 Lights Out - Seattle, Washington

South Central 

 shame. - Fort Collins, Colorado
 The Strangers - Westminster, Colorado
 Love Tractor - Denver, Colorado
 Mesteno - Denver, Colorado
 Impact - Wichita, Kansas

Southwest
 ABBQ - San Francisco, California
 Birds of Paradise - San Diego, California
 Blackbird - San Francisco, California
 Buckwild - Sacramento, California
 BW Ultimate - Sunnyvale, California
 California Burrito - San Diego, California
 Classy - San Francisco, California
 Cutthroat - Reno, Nevada
 Donuts  - Bay Area, California
 Family Style - Los Angeles, California
 Fear and Loathing - Las Vegas, Nevada
 Firefly - San Francisco, California
 Instant Karma - Tucson, Arizona
 Long Beach Legacy - Long Beach, California
 Lotus - Los Angeles, California
 Mischief - San Francisco, California
 Pivot - Phoenix, Arizona
 Platypi - Chico, California
 Polar Bears - San Francisco, California
 Robot - Santa Barbara, California
 Rogue - Tucson, Arizona
 Rubix - Phoenix, Arizona
 Spoiler Alert - Los Angeles, California
 Superstition - Phoenix, Arizona

USA masters
USA Ultimate defines Masters-eligible players as men 33 and over as well as women 30 and over as of December 31 of the current year.

Northeast
 GLUM - Ottawa, Ontario, Canada

Mid-Atlantic
 Boneyard - Raleigh-Durham, North Carolina
 Black Cans & Highlands - Washington, D.C.
 Trainwreck - Raleigh-Durham, North Carolina

South
 Reckon - Atlanta/Tennessee
 Woolly Mammoth - Florida 
 Tejas - Texas
 Rust - Birmingham, Alabama

Central
 Surly - Twin Cities, Minnesota
 Wasted Talent - Chicago, Illinois
 Old Style - Madison, Wisconsin

Northwest
 Burnside - Portland, Oregon
 FIGJAM - Calgary, Alberta, Canada

Southwest
 Crawl - Arizona
 Johnny Encore - Boulder/Denver, Colorado
 Old Stones - San Diego, CA

Europe
  Stack Overflow (Hagenberg, Austria)
  FreezzzBeezzz (Brugge, Belgium) 
  JetSet (Leuven, Belgium)
  Gentle (Ghent, Belgium)
  De Karolingers (Knokke-Heist, Belgium)
  Flywin (Namur, Belgium)
  XLR8RS (Brussels, Belgium)
  Mooncatchers (Brussels, Belgium)
  Ouftimate (Liège, Belgium)
  Flying Penguins (Rixensart, Belgium)
  Diabolic Heaven (Hasselt, Belgium) 
  KFK (Copenhagen, Denmark)
  Dinosaurs (Aalborg, Denmark)
  AUC Mojn (Aabenraa, Denmark)
  Ragnarok (Copenhagen, Denmark)
  Disc Control (Toerring, Denmark)
  KFUM Örebro frisbee (Örebro, Sweden)
  Ah Ouh Puc (Paris, France)
  Contact Disc Club (Les Brouzils, France)
  Euskadisk (Biarritz, France)
  Friselis (Versailles, France)
  Krampouz (Lannion, France)
  Mr Friz (Rennes, France)
  Frisbeurs Nantais (Nantes, France)
  Moustix (Lyon, France)
  Nantchester United (Nantes, France)
  Revolution'air (Paris, France)
  Ultimate Club Vesontio - Friz'Bisontins (Besançon, France)
  ZIGGLES (Antibes, France)
  Alphabet Soup (London, UK)
  ABH (London, UK)
  Airwolf (University of Wolverhampton, Wolverhampton, UK)
  Aye-Aye Ultimate (Norwich (UEA), UK)
  Bath Ultimate (University of Bath, UK)
  Birmingham Ultimate (Birmingham, UK)
  Black Sheep (Manchester, UK)
  Blue Arse Flies (Evesham, UK)
  The Bournemouth Ultimatum (Bournemouth, UK)
  Brighton Panthers (University of Brighton, Brighton, UK)
  Brighton Ultimate (Brighton, UK)
  Camden Ultimate (London, UK)
  Chevron Action Flash (Manchester, UK)
  Clapham (London, UK)
  Cloud City Ultimate (London, UK)
  Curve (London, UK)
  Devon (Devon, UK)
  DUF (Durham University, UK)
  Didsbury Ultimate Frisbee For Amateurs (Manchester, UK)
  East Midlands Open (East Midlands, UK)
  Falmouth Community Ultimate (Cornwall, UK) 
  Fire of London (London, UK)
  Fish (Lancaster University, Lancaster, UK)
  Flyght Club (East Midlands, UK)
  Flying Aces (Staffordshire University, Stafford, UK)
  Fully-Charged  (Portsmouth/London, UK)
  Halcyon (Manchester, UK)
  High Fliers (Southampton, UK)
  HS Beavers (London School of Economics, UK)
  Iceni (London, UK)
  Jusdisc League (London, UK)
  Kapow! (London, UK)
  Keele Koogaz (Keele, UK)
  Kent Touch This (University of Kent, Canterbury, UK)
  Kernow Ultimate (Cornwall, UK)
  Leeds Ultimate (Leeds, UK)
  Leeds University Ultimate (University of Leeds, Leeds, UK)
  Mohawks Ultimate (University of Sussex, Brighton, UK)
  Mythago  (University of Bristol, UK)
  OW! (University of Oxford, UK)
  Red (Leicester, UK)
  Release (Southampton, UK)
  The Saints (Teesside, UK)
  Salford Chucks (Salford, UK)
  Shake & Bake (Exeter, UK)
  Shakedown (Exeter, UK)
  St Austell Ultimate (Cornwall, UK) 
  Steal (Sheffield, UK)
  Strange Blue (Combined University of Cambridge, Cambridge City and Anglia Ruskin University team, Cambridge, UK)
  STUFT (Staffordshire University, Stoke, UK)
  Team Shark (Oxford, UK)
  Tooting Tigers (South London, UK)
  uBu (University of Birmingham, UK)
  University of Nottingham Ultimate (University of Nottingham, UK)
  Vision (Merseyside, UK)
  Warwick Bears (University of Warwick, UK)
  YOpen Ultimate (York, UK)
  York Ultimate (York University Ultimate, York, UK)
  Zoo (London, UK)
  Atis Tirma (Las Palmas de Gran Canaria, Spain)
  Diskolaris (Bilbao, Spain)
  Huesca (Huesca, Spain)
  Cachapililla (Valladolid, Spain)
  Cidbee (Burgos, Spain)
  Corocotta Ultimate Cantabria (Santander, Spain)
  Disctèrics (Girona, Spain)
  Fendisc (Santander, Spain)
  Frisbillanas (Sevilla, Spain)
  Guayota (Tenerife, Spain)
  Los Quijotes (Madrid, Spain)
  Granayd (Granada, Spain)
  Patatas Bravas (Barcelona, Spain)
  Peixets (Barcelona, Spain)
  Quimera (Salamanca, Spain)
  Tookadisc (Celrà, Girona, Spain)
  Winds N'Roses (Roses, Girona, Spain)
  Zierzo (Zaragoza, Spain)
  Ultimate Frisbee Club Heraklion (Heraklion, Crete, Greece)
  Ultimate Frisbee Club Athens (Athens, Greece)
  Discs In Turmoil  (Dublin Institute of Technology)
  Chilli-O  (University College Dublin)
  Trinity College, Dublin
  Captain Huck  (Dublin City University)
  Skultimate  (University College Cork)
  NUIG Panteras  (National University of Ireland, Galway)
  UL Ninjas  (University of Limerick)
  Institute of Technology Tallaght
  Jabba The Huck
  Johnny Chimpo
  Broccoli Ultimate
  Captain Drinking Binge
  Open Club Sandwich
  Mixed Veg
  Throwing Shapes
  Maynooth Marvels (National University Ireland, Maynooth)
  Drop That Smile (Vilnius, Lithuania)
  KosssMix (Vilnius, Lithuania)
  Marių Meškos (Klaipėda, Lithuania)
  Skraidantys Drambliai (Kaunas, Lithuania)
  Taškas (Zarasai, Lithuania)
  Velniai (Jurbarkas, Lithuania)
  Vorai (Vilnius, Lithuania)
  Zepps (Vilnius, Lithuania)
  ZERO (Vilnius, Lithuania)
  Mela (Malta)
  Belfast Ultimate Giants
 CHASE (Comber, Down)
  Deep Heat
  CamboCakes Amsterdam 
  042 Łódź (Łódź, Poland)
  Grandmaster Flash (Warsaw, Poland)
  BC Kosmodysk (Warsaw, Poland)
  Mashtalesh Team (Kraśnik, Poland)
  Zawierucha (Warsaw, Poland)
  Disc'Over Lisboa (Lisbon, Portugal)
  Disco À MessiNense (São Bartolomeu de Messines, Portugal)
  Gambozinos (Aveiro, Portugal)
  Leiria Flying Discs (Leiria, Portugal)
  Lisbon Ultimate Clube (Lisbon, Portugal)
  Vira'o'Disco (Palmela, Portugal)
  Ultimate Frisbee Algarve (Portimao, Portugal)
  Sneeekys (Scotland)
  Black Eagles ('Beagles') (Edinburgh, Scotland)
  Abstract (Scotland)
  Blaze (Stirling)
  Heriot-Watt (Edinburgh, Scotland)
  Dark Horses (Glasgow)
  Far Flung (Glasgow)
  Glasgow Ultimate (Glasgow)
  Flatball (St Andrews)
  Fusion (Scotland)
  Johnny Foreigner (Scotland)
  Positive Mojo (Aberdeen)
  Ro Sham Bo (Edinburgh)
  Dundee Ultimate (Dundee)
  Disquitos (Oulu, Finland)
  Polli (Espoo, Finland)
  Karhukopla (Espoo, Finland)
  LeKi (Lempäälä, Finland)
  Sipoo Odd Stars SOS (Sipoo, Finland)
  Saints (Vaasa, Finland)
  Team (Helsinki, Finland)
  Terror (Turku, Finland)
  UFO (Tampere, Finland)
  Mental Discorders (Bratislava, Slovakia)
  Scorpions (Bratislava, Slovakia)
  Discredit (Bratislava, Slovakia)
  Outsiterz (Bratislava, Slovakia)
  KEfear (Košice, Slovakia)
  Freespeed Basel (Basel, Switzerland)
  Disc Club Panthers (Bern, Switzerland)
  Crazy Dogs (Stans, Switzerland)
  Budwig Ultimate (Neuchâtel, Switzerland)
  Fly High (Lausanne, Switzerland)
  Flying Angels (Bern, Switzerland)
  Flying Colors (Oberkirch, Switzerland)
  Flying Saucers (Luzern, Switzerland)
  Scorillaz (Bern, Switzerland)
  Solebang (Cham, Switzerland)
  Zürich Ultimate (Zürich, Switzerland)
  Hijack (Kerns, Switzerland)
  Mange-Disques (Nyon, Switzerland)
  Red I's (Sarnen, Switzerland)
  Skyhawks (Winterthur, Switzerland)
  Wizards (Genf, Switzerland)
  Wombats (Willisau, Switzerland)
  Bilkent Goats (team of Bilkent University) (Ankara, Turkey)
  06UC Ultimate (team of Middle East Technical University) (Ankara, Turkey)
  Bogazici Ultimate (team of Boğaziçi University) (Istanbul, Turkey)
  Caddebostan Olympics (Istanbul, Turkey)
  ITU Ultimate (team of Istanbul Technical University) (Istanbul, Turkey)
  Turk Kasi (Istanbul, Turkey)
  Baltimate (İzmir, Turkey)
  Ugly Ducklings Ultimate (Swansea, Wales)
  R.P.M (Swansea, Wales)
  Mwnci See (Aberystwyth, Wales)
  Mwnci Do (Aberystwyth, Wales)
  Aber Gold (Aberystwyth, Wales)
  Frizee Rascals (Bridgend, Wales)
  Bangor Ultimate (Bangor, Wales)
  No Frills (Cardiff, Wales)
  Brân Flakes (Cwmbrân, Wales)

Asia-Pacific

Australia

Australian Capital Territory
  Burley Griffins Ultimate (Canberra, Australia) - Mixed
  Exploding Kittens (Canberra, Australia) - Mixed
  F-Troop (Canberra, Australia) - Mixed
  Factory (Canberra, Australia) - Women's
  Fyshwick Ultimate (Canberra, Australia) - Open
  H.I.V.E. (Canberra, Australia) - Mixed

New South Wales
  Bench (Sydney, Australia) - Open
  Banana Republic Ultimate (Sydney, Australia) - Mixed
  Bin Chicken Ultimate (Sydney, Australia) - Mixed
  DUFF (Sydney, Australia) - Mixed, Open, Women's
  GWS Blaze (Sydney, Australia) - Women's
  Hills Ultimate (Sydney, Australia) - Mixed, Women's
  I-Beam (Newcastle, Australia) - Open
  Inner West Ultimate (Sydney, Australia) - Mixed, Open, Women's
  Kaf (Sydney, Australia) - Mixed
  Krank (Wollongong, Australia) - Mixed, Open
  Manly Ultimate (Sydney, Australia) - Mixed, Open, Women's
  Pie Wagon (Newcastle, Australia) - Mixed
  Pompey Magnus (Sydney, Australia) - Mixed
  Rogue (Sydney, Australia) - Women's
  Sugar Magnolias (Newcastle, Australia) - Women's
  Sunder (Sydney, Australia) - Open
  Surge (Wollongong, Australia) - Women's
  VLS (Sydney, Australia) - Mixed

Queensland
  Extinction (Brisbane, Australia) - Mixed, Open, Women's
  Fuse (Brisbane, Australia) - Women's
  Gentlemen's Club (Brisbane, Australia) - Open
  Ladies Lounge (Brisbane, Australia) - Women's
  Mammoth (Brisbane, Australia) - Open
  Monstars (Brisbane, Australia) - Mixed
  League of Ivy (Townsville, Australia) - Women's
  Townsvillians (Townsville, Australia) - Mixed, Open

South Australia
  Outbreak (Adelaide, Australia) - Open
  Valkyrie (Adelaide, Australia) - Women's
  Vanguard (Adelaide, Australia) - Mixed
  Zig Theory (Adelaide, Australia) - Women's

Victoria
  Ballarat Ultimate (Ballarat, Australia) - Mixed, Open, Women's
  Bauhaus (Melbourne, Australia) - Women's
  Brunswick Ultimate Disc Society (Melbourne, Australia) - Mixed
  Chilly Ultimate Club (Melbourne, Australia) - Open, Women's
  Ellipsis (Melbourne, Australia) - Open, Women's
  Funny Duck Ultimate (Melbourne, Australia) - Mixed, Open
  Heads of State (Melbourne, Australia) - Mixed, Open, Women's
  Geelong Mudlarks (Geelong, Australia) - Mixed, Open
  Kahlipsquid (Melbourne, Australia) - Mixed
  Meraki (Melbourne, Australia) - Mixed
  Paradigm (Melbourne, Australia) - Mixed
  Pirates Heart Ninjas (Melbourne, Australia) - Mixed
  Project Lad Mixed Ultimate (Melbourne, Australia) - Mixed
  Wild M&M&Ms (Melbourne, Australia) - Mixed
  Wyndham Ultimate (Melbourne, Australia) - Mixed, Open, Women's

Western Australia
  Marlow Street (Perth, Australia) - Mixed
  Bronze Bullseye (Perth, Australia) - Open
  Disc Graceful (Perth, Australia) - Mixed
  Kaos Ultimate (Perth, Australia) - Women's
  Sisko (Perth, Australia) - Women's
  Sublime (Perth, Australia) - Mixed, Open, Women's
  Curtin Ultimate Club (Perth, Australia) - Mixed

China
  Big Brother
  Beijing Bang
  Hangtime
  Air Kazak
  Tianjin Speed
  Guangzhou Storm
  Dalian Smurfs
  Ningbo UFO
  Shanghai Wings
  Shanghai HUWA
  Shenzhen Peng
  Shenzhen ZEN
  Qingdao FUQ
  Air Woo
  Hurricane Zhuhai
  Artemis Moonshot Academy,Beijing

India

  Air Traffic Control (Bangalore, India)
  Airbenders (Bangalore, India)
  Airborne (Chennai, India)
  Alphas (Auroville, India)
  Ashoka Hammerheads (Sonepat, India)
  BITS UFC (Goa, India)
  Blitzkrieg (Chennai, India)
  Callahans (Chennai, India)
  Chakraa (Chennai, India)
  Deaf and Dumb (Surat, India)
  Disc-o-Deewane (Bangalore, India)
  Discotech (Hyderabad, India)
  Discreed (Coimbatore, India)
  Dream Catchers (Ahmedabad, India)
  Falcons (Bangalore, India)
  FlyWild (Chennai, India)
  Jumbish (Surat, India)
  Learning To Fly (Bangalore, India)
  Minions (Surat, India)
  Night Crawlers (Mumbai, India)
  Spinergy (Auroville, India)
  Stall 7 (Chennai, India)
  Storm Chasers (Mumbai, India)
  Strikers (Surat, India)
  Thatte Idli Kaal Soup (Bangalore, India)
  Trailblazers (Surat, India)
  West Coast Rascals (Mumbai, India)
  Zer0 Gravity (Surat, India)

Indonesia
  Discindo (Jakarta, Indonesia)

Japan
  Buzz Bullets 
  Iku! 
  Tajima Gyu

Malaysia
  Carebears 
  AUR 
  Sohai JJ 
  SWAT 7d
  Wildcats
  Oops
  Badgers
  The Islanders
  Panthers
  ULTRAS
  Headhunters
  X-Cross
  Flying Naan
  Satu Lagi
  Rojaks
  Los Ninos 
  UiTM Lions
  SaTe-Shah Alam Ultimate
  Black Unicorn

New Zealand
  Credo (Christchurch, New Zealand)
  Endeavour (Auckland, New Zealand)
  Groot (Auckland, New Zealand)
  Hammertron (Hamilton, New Zealand)
  Wildcats (Wellington, New Zealand)
  Blueberries (Auckland, New Zealand)
  Capital Punishment (Wellington, New Zealand)
  Chch Chicks (Christchurch, New Zealand)
  Naaasty Women (Christchurch, New Zealand)
  Vixenz (Auckland, New Zealand)
  Zodiac (Auckland, New Zealand)

Southeast Asia

Philippines
  Dragons 
  Pirates 
  Sunken Pleasure 
  Rogers 
  Sid Vicious 
  Stags Ultimate
  Friday Frisbee - AUP
  Circuit Breakers 
  Ateneo Ultimate 
  Weekend Karma 
  Admirals Ultimate 
  Woodrose Ultimate 
  South Luzon Ultimate 
  Monsters 
  Cavite Kids 
  Pusakalz 
  Animo Ultimate
  Super Bueno
  UP DUO 
  Barangay Don Jose Spiders 
  Blackfleet Ultimate 
  Xavier Ultimate

Singapore
  Shiok - Mixed, Opens, Women's
  Chuckies - Mixed
  Disc Knights - Mixed
  Disctractors 
  Freakshow
  Thirsty Camels Ultimate
  Zero Discplacement
  Helix 
  Rascals 
  Havoc - Women's
  Crimson Clovers - Women's
  Crackerjacks - Opens

South Korea
  Subliminal (Seoul, South Korea)
  붐얼티밋  (Daegu & Pohang, South Korea)

Vietnam
  Hanoi Ultimate Club (Hanoi, Vietnam)
  Saigon Ultimate Club (Ho Chi Minh City, Vietnam)
Both Vietnamese teams may appear as team Vudoo (Vietnam Ultimate Defense Offense Organization) in international tournaments across Asia.

Africa

Egypt 

  Alexandria Ultimate
  AUC Mayhem
  GUC Airbenders
  MUDD
  Supernova 
  Flicking Pharaohs
  Thunder
  Zayed Nar

Mozambique
  Da Bique (Maputo)

Morocco
  MOROCCAN FLYING DISC ASSOCIATION (MFDA) - Morocco
  MYUA (Moroccan Youth Ultimate Association) - Marrakesh
  Ultikech - Marrakesh
  AUI Ultimate Comets - (Ifrane)

South Africa
(in alphabetic order)
  Catch 22 (Cape Town)
  Chilli (Cape Town)
  Gale Force (Port Elizabeth)
  Ghost Ultimate Club (Cape Town)
  Hammerheads (East London)
  Labradors (Pretoria)
  Long Donkeys (Pietermaritzburg)
  Maties Ultimate (Stellenbosch)
  Orange Farm (Johannesburg)
  Bunnies (Durban)
  Rebels (East London)
  Zone Rangers (Johannesburg)
  Salusa 45 (Cape Town)
  Skyveld (Johannesburg)
  Soweto Ultimate (Johannesburg)
  UCT Flying Tigers (Cape Town)
  UCT Roaring Tigers (Cape Town)
  Ult Ctrl Del (Johannesburg)
  Ultimates (Polokwane)
  Ultitude (Gauteng)
  WITS Voodoo Kudus (Johannesburg)

Central and South America

Argentina 
 Jauría (La Plata, Argentina)

Mexico 
 Malafama (Mexico City, Mexico)

Bolivia 
 Ara Jüu (Santa Cruz, Bolivia)

Colombia 
 Revolution (Medellín, Colombia)

References

 Championship Series results
 Swiss Ultimate
 UPA Club Sectional & Regional Map
 South African club teams and locations
 Cornwall Ultimate (UK)

 
Ultimate